Pierre Segond-Weber (born 1886, date of death unknown) was a French painter. His work was part of the painting event in the art competition at the 1924 Summer Olympics.

References

1886 births
Year of death missing
19th-century French painters
20th-century French painters
20th-century French male artists
French male painters
Olympic competitors in art competitions
Place of birth missing
19th-century French male artists